is a former Japanese football player he is the current assistant manager of J1 League club Urawa Red Diamonds.

Playing career
Hirakawa was born in Shizuoka on 1 May 1979. After graduating from University of Tsukuba, he joined J1 League club Urawa Reds in 2002. Although he is originally a right side player, he became a regular player as left side midfielder from July. Reds won the champions in 2003 J.League Cup first time in the club history. In 2004, Reds gained Alessandro Santos and Hirakawa lost his position as left side midfielder. So, Hirakawa played many positions, stopper of three backs, right side midfielder in 2004 season.

However his opportunity to play decreased summer 2004. In 2006, he became a regular player as right side midfielder and Reds won the champions J1 League first time in the club history. In 2007, although he could hardly play in the match behind Nobuhisa Yamada until summer, he became a regular player as left side midfielder as Santos successor and Reds won the champions in 2007 AFC Champions League. In 2008, he played many matches as right and left side midfielder. Although he could not play many matches for injury in 2009, he played as regular player as right and left side back of four backs from 2010. From 2012, he played many matches as right side midfielder.

However he could hardly play in the match behind young player Takahiro Sekine from 2015. He retired end of 2018 season.

Club statistics

*Includes other competitive competitions, including the J.League Championship, Japanese Super Cup and FIFA Club World Cup.

Awards and honours

Club
Urawa Red Diamonds
J1 League: 1
 2006
Emperor's Cup: 2
 2005, 2006
J.League Cup: 2
 2003, 2016
AFC Champions League: 2
 2017, 2007
Japanese Super Cup: 1
 2006

References

External links

1979 births
Living people
University of Tsukuba alumni
Association football people from Shizuoka Prefecture
Japanese footballers
J1 League players
Urawa Red Diamonds players
Association football defenders